HNoMS Brand was a 1.-class torpedo boat constructed in 1898. She served the Royal Norwegian Navy for more than four decades, including neutrality protection duties during the First World War. Having once again been employed on neutrality protection duty at the outbreak of the Second World War, Brand was captured by the Germans during their invasion of Norway in April 1940.

After serving in Nazi Germany's Kriegsmarine in the Norwegian Campaign that followed the invasion, she was renamed Tarantel and employed as a Vorpostenboot in occupied Norway. Having survived the Second World War, Brand was returned to the Royal Norwegian Navy in May 1945 and soon decommissioned and scrapped.

Design and construction
The three vessels were the first of their class to be built in Norway, the first three 1.-class boats having been built and delivered by the German Schichau-Werke shipbuilders.

Brand was armed with two 37 mm quick-firing guns and two 45 cm torpedo tubes, and manned by a crew of 19 officers and men.

The design of the German-built vessels and the 1898 series that included Brand, was criticized for having insufficient speed. Although considered as having quite good seagoing characteristics, the vessels had difficulty firing torpedoes in rough seas. In calm seas the boats were hard to spot, with little engine noise or bow wave, which increased the chance of a successful torpedo attack. The boats were also seen as not being manoeuvrable enough, as well as having an exposed bridge in a bow turret and poor ventilation. Some of the issues of the early vessels were dealt with in the last four 1.-class boats built.

Early service

In the summer of 1900, Brand took part in a comparatively large-scale naval exercise, together with three other 1.-class boats ,  and Trods. The exercises saw the torpedo boats and the larger warships train on coordinating their manoeuvres and actions. During the training cruise Brand was under the command of the future Royal Norwegian Navy Shipyard director, Captain Christian Blom. During the summer training cruises of 1901 and 1905, Brand was under the command of the future Arctic explorer First Lieutenant Rolf von Krogh.

First World War
When the First World War broke out in 1914, the Royal Norwegian Navy and the Norwegian coastal fortresses were fully mobilized, along with supporting units of the Norwegian Army. The state of armed neutrality was maintained until the end of the war in 1918. Brand took part in neutrality protection patrols during the war, and was based in Bergen in Western Norway. In May 1915, Brand carried out torpedo firing exercises together with three other torpedo boats.

In the immediate aftermath of the war, from 12 December 1918 until the spring of 1919, Brand was stationed at Ålesund. She was tasked with patrolling for drifting mines off the coast. During their stay in Ålesund, the torpedo boat's crew deactivated or destroyed 17 naval mines, and were also put and stand-by to intervene in riots between locals and fishermen in Fosnavåg. In February 1919, the crew of Brand rescued two survivors from the shipwrecked fishing vessel Korsfjord I, which had run aground with the loss of seven crewmen.

Inter-war years
Between the world wars, the Norwegian torpedo boat fleet carried out exercises during the summers, but were severely restricted by a lack of funds. The boats that had been built around the start of the 20th century were outdated as warships, and mostly restricted to lying in port. Seventeen torpedo boats had been decommissioned in the years 1920–1931, after having been worn out by the intensive neutrality protection service in the preceding war years. Although 23 torpedo boats were retained, no modernizations were carried out, and the vessels were considered as being mostly useful as escorts and coastal guard vessels.

Second World War

Neutrality protection
At the outbreak of the Second World War, many of the vessels of the Royal Norwegian Navy were activated for neutrality protection duties. The 1939 mobilization of both the Royal Norwegian Navy and the coastal artillery was less comprehensive than that in 1914, due to a lack of trained crews and officers to man the ships. Brand was mobilized, and formed part of the 2nd Naval District's 4th Torpedo Boat Division. The 4th Torpedo Boat Division was under the command of Lieutenant Thorleif Pettersen, who was also the commanding officer of Storm. Brand was under the command of Second Lieutenant Ivar Arne Midtland, and carried out escort missions along the Norwegian coast after the outbreak of war. The ships of the Royal Norwegian Navy were scattered along the Norwegian coast to provide a capacity to hail and escort foreign ships and confront possible neutrality violators at as many points as possible. The deployment of the warships singly with large distances between each vessel reduced their combat value against any determined naval attack against Norway. By April 1940, Brand was based at Fedje, but had been sent to Bergen for repairs at the naval base Marineholmen days before the 9 April 1940 German invasion of Norway.

On 8 April 1940, the commanding officer of the 2nd Naval District, Rear-Admiral Carsten Tank-Nielsen ordered the commanders of Brand, Sæl and Storm to refuel, resupply ammunition and put their boats on action stations. Brand began resupplying in Bergen shortly after receiving her orders from Rear-Admiral Tank-Nielsen. Similar orders went out the other warships of Bergen section of the naval district, foremost the destroyer  and the submarine .

German invasion
Reports of fighting between Norwegian coastal fortresses and foreign warships in the Oslofjord further east reached the 2nd Naval District at 00:28 on 9 April. In response to the reports, naval mines were laid in the leads off Bergen and torpedo boats deployed to intercept any possible intruders making their way towards the city. Warning shots and live rounds were fired shortly after 02:00 at the intruding German flotilla by Lerøy Fort, and unsuccessful attacks and intercepts carried out by several warships as the warships of the German Gruppe 3 closed in on Bergen. Brand had been ordered to take up an ambush position at Alvøy, but was delayed in reaching her designated position by necessary repairs. The Norwegian warships at Bergen had been ordered by Rear-Admiral Tank-Nielsen to fire at any intruding ships.

Having completed her repairs, Brand left Marineholmen at 03:30. By that time the German invasion flotilla had reached the inner line of fortifications off Bergen, and was being engaged by the forts at Kvarven and Hellen. Brand was put on action stations and readied for torpedo attack from a position in the inlet Gravdalsviken. From her ambush position Brand could serve as a substitute for Kvarven's torpedo battery, which was inoperable at the time. Although one or both of the torpedo launchers on Brand were primed and ready to fire at the intruding warships and chances to score a hit were "exceptionally good", Second Lieutenant Midtland failed to give the order to fire. Eventually the increasing daylight reduced the chances of a successful attack, and the Germans had completed their intrusion into Bergen harbour. After removing his ship from her defensive position, Second Lieutenant Midtland brought Brand to port in Laksevåg, before leaving the boat and crew and heading to Marineholmen, where he was quickly interned by the Germans. Second Lieutenant Midtland had decided against scuttling his vessel, later claiming to have discussed the matter with a senior officer who had advised him that there was no point in destroying Brand due to the vessel's age. The remaining crew members abandoned Brand on 11 April. On 16 April, the Germans seized Brand in Laksevåg and took her into Kriegsmarine service. The Norwegian crew from Brand was interned at Marineholmen and held captive on various ships for close to two months. Brand was one of four Norwegian warships captured by the Germans near Bergen shortly after their attack, the others being the minelayer  and two guard ships.

Lieutenant (promoted since 1940) Ivar Arne Midtland was investigated post-war by the Military Investigative Commission of 1946, and found to have violated Paragraphs 77 and 99 of the Norwegian military penal code by not attacking when he had the chance, but was let off with a reprimand because of his "youth and inexperience".

German service
Shortly after their 16 April take-over of Brand, the Germans sent her and a motor boat to land troops on the island of Flatøy near Bergen. Flatøy was the location of both a coastal fort and a Royal Norwegian Navy Air Service base. As Brand was landing German troops on the south side of the island, a British Blackburn Skua dive bomber attacked the torpedo boat at around 07:00. Brand was struck in the boiler room amidships by a bomb that failed to explode and severely damaged, the German crew suffering casualties. The air attack led the Germans to abandon their landings and use the motor boat to tow Brand to Bergen for repairs. A German sailor who had been thrown overboard by the bomb and swam ashore at Isdalstø was captured by Norwegian troops and brought to Balestrand on 17 April. Brand was further damaged in an attack on Bergen harbour by 803 Naval Air Squadron Blackburn Skuas later the same day, along with the U-boat . Although spotted by Norwegian Marinens Flyvebaatfabrikk M.F.11 reconnaissance seaplanes late on 30 April, Brand was mistaken for a warship under Norwegian or British control and not attacked. The German-manned torpedo boat also escaped the attention of searching Norwegian warships. The fighting  in Western Norway ended on 2 May 1940. During her initial stint in German service, Brand was manned by a crew drawn from the training ship .

Brand was renamed Tarantel by the Germans and used as a Vorpostenboot in occupied Norway for the duration of the war. She initially served in the Hafenschutz flotille Bergen with pennant number NB. 19, before she was transferred to 55th Vorpoosten flotille in December 1940 and given the pennant number V.5519. The Germans rebuilt her slightly during the war years, including adding an enclosed bridge, two machine guns and six depth charges. Tarantel was handed over to the Royal Norwegian Navy following the German capitulation in 1945. The Norwegians did not return the old torpedo boat to active service again, instead decommissioning and scrapping her in 1946. Brands name was reused for a former German E-boat (ex-S-303) which served in the Royal Norwegian Navy from 1947 to 1951.

References
Notes

Citations

Bibliography

 
 
 
 
 
 
 
 
 
 
 
 
 

 
 
 

1898 ships
Ships built in Horten
Torpedo boats of the Royal Norwegian Navy
World War II torpedo boats of Norway
Maritime incidents in April 1940
Naval ships of Norway captured by Germany during World War II